The 2007 San Jose Grand Prix at Redback Raceway is the ninth round of the 2007 Champ Car World Series Season.  It was held on July 29 at the Redback Raceway temporary street circuit, in San Jose, California.

Qualifying results

Sébastien Bourdais lead Friday's qualification session with a late fast lap near the end of qualifying. However he faded on Saturday due to some mechanical issues with his car and Justin Wilson posted the fast lap Saturday taking the pole. By virtue of his fast lap Friday Bourdais managed to maintain second position on the grid into the race.

Race
The first two editions of the San Jose Grand Prix were mostly processional affairs with little to no passing.  The 2007 edition, on the other hand, proved to be a very competitive affair with the winner fighting through the field from 15th position on the starting grid.  The race was reminiscent of the Cleveland race where Paul Tracy rebounded from early contact and pit stops to win the race, except this race was held on a tight street circuit and not on Cleveland's wide open airport runways.  The recent introduction of a painted white line in certain corners to visually enforce Champ Car's "no blocking" rule has resulted in the unintended but happy consequence of increasing the possibility of overtaking.

The standing start went off without a hitch but trouble hit at the Turn 1 hairpin, where a logjam developed in the rear of the field.  Robert Doornbos lurched into the back of Jan Heylen's car knocking off his own front wing.  Meanwhile, Sébastien Bourdais made a mistake in Turn 2, allowing Justin Wilson to take the lead.  Doornbos and Heylen pitted under the yellow resulting from their contact.

More trouble hit as the field was preparing to take the green flag.  Second place runner Dan Clarke ran into the back of Justin Wilson's car on the Balbach straight.  The rear suspension on Wilson's car was damaged, sending him to the pits.  The damage was eventually repaired, but Wilson finished the race 20 laps off the leader.  Clarke's day was done.

Oriol Servià took advantage of the misfortune in front of him and led until lap 34 when Neel Jani was able to pass him at Turn 1.  The two drivers would continue to battle at or near the front of the race the rest of the day.

Doornbos, who had set off on an alternate strategy after his early pit stop, found himself in the lead for 12 laps after the main field made their first pit stop.  Making best use of the clear track and his light fuel load, Doornbos drove a series of fast laps and only dropped to third place behind Jani and Servià after his stop on lap 54.

On lap 64 Servià made a move on Jani in Turn 1, but was unable to make the pass stick.  One lap later Servià tried the same move again, and this time was able keep Jani behind him as they drove out of the hairpin.

Paul Tracy running out of fuel on the Balbach straight on lap 76 provided a timely yellow flag for Doornbos who was then able to get back into the same pit sequence as the rest of the field.  A very fast stop by his Team Minardi USA crew (and a bobble by Servià's) catapulted Doornbos into the lead in front of Jani.

Jani used his final Power to Pass allotment to overtake Doornbos on the restart.  Unfortunately for him, Jani was driving this final stint on the soft Bridgestone "reds", and he was soon struggling for grip.  With two seconds left on his own Power to Pass allotment, Doornbos slipped past Jani on lap 95 and drove away to the victory by six seconds.  Despite his bad tires Jani was able to hold off Servià for second.

Box score

* Pagenaud assessed 25 second time penalty for blocking.

Caution flags

Lap leader breakdown

Total laps led

 New Race Record Robert Doornbos :  1:45:07.617
 Average Speed 88.123 mph

Championship standings after the race

Drivers' Championship standings

 Note: Only the top five positions are included.

Attendance
Attendance for the 2007 San Jose Grand Prix was approximately 120,000 over the 3 day race weekend which was comparable to the 2006 edition of the race. Paid attendance was down slightly to 81,538 over the 3 day weekend from 83,248 the year before. However Champ Car race day attendance was up year over year to approximately 43,000 people.

References

External links
 Full Weekend Times & Results
 Race Box Score
 Drivers Standings After Race

 

San Jose, California Grand Prix
San Jose, California
Sports in San Jose, California